Megalopalpus metaleucus, the large harvester, is a butterfly in the family Lycaenidae. It is found in Liberia, Ivory Coast, Ghana, Togo, Nigeria, Cameroon, the Republic of the Congo, the Central African Republic, the Democratic Republic of the Congo (Mayumbe, Mongala, Uele, Equateur and Sankuru) and Uganda. The habitat consists of forests.

References

External links
Seitz, A. Die Gross-Schmetterlinge der Erde 13: Die Afrikanischen Tagfalter. Plate XIII 65 f

Butterflies described in 1893
Miletinae
Butterflies of Africa